Gymnopilus flavus is a species of mushroom in the family Hymenogastraceae. It was given its current name by mycologist Rolf Singer in 1951.

See also
List of Gymnopilus species

References

External links
Gymnopilus flavus at Index Fungorum

flavus